Syam  Ben Youssef (born 31 March 1989) is a Tunisian professional footballer who plays as a centre-back for Quevilly-Rouen.

Club career

Bastia
Born in Marseille, Ben Youssef passed by the Union sportif des traminots Marseille and the training center of SC Bastia.

ES Tunis
He joined ES Tunis on a two-year contract on 12 August 2009, he made his professional debut in the Tunisian championship on 12 September 2009, against CS Sfaxien (4–0) at Stade 7 November, and scored his first goal. On 14 December, he received his first convocation with the national team.

Leyton Orient
In 2012 Ben Youssef played for English club Leyton Orient,

Astra Giurgiu
He signed to Astra Giurgiu in Romania, where he remained three seasons, won 2013–14 Cupa României and discovered European competitions.

Caen
On 29 June 2015, free of any contract with the Romanian club, Ben Youssef committed for three seasons to Caen, he played his first match in Ligue 1 on 22 August against OGC Nice. He scored his first goal in the fifth day against Troyes AC.

Kasımpaşa
On 5 July 2017, he agreed with Caen to cancel his contract and joined the Turkish club Kasımpaşa for three seasons.

Denizlispor
Ben Youssef moved to Turkish club Denizlispor in 2020.

CFR Cluj
On 4 November 2020, Ben Youssef joined Romanian club CFR Cluj.

Beroe
In February 2022, Ben Youssef signed with Bulgarian First League club Beroe. He left Beroe at the end of the season.

International career
With the Tunisia Ben Youssef started in 2013. He played his first African Cup in 2015, he participated also in 2017 Africa Cup of Nations.

On 17 November 2015, he scored his first goal with the Tunisian team in the second round of the 2018 World Cup qualification against Mauritania.

In June 2018 he was named in Tunisia’s 23-man squad for the 2018 FIFA World Cup in Russia.

Career statistics

Scores and results list Tunisia's goal tally first, score column indicates score after each Ben Youssef goal.

Honours
ES Tunis
CAF Champions League: 2011
Tunisian Ligue 1: 2009–10, 2010–11
Tunisian Cup: 2010–11

Astra Giurgiu
Cupa României: 2013–14
Supercupa României: 2014

CFR Cluj
Liga I: 2020–21
Supercupa României: 2020

References

External links

1989 births
Living people
Citizens of Tunisia through descent
Tunisian people of Algerian descent
French sportspeople of Algerian descent
French sportspeople of Tunisian descent
Tunisian footballers
Footballers from Marseille
Association football defenders
Tunisia international footballers
Tunisian Ligue Professionnelle 1 players
English Football League players
Liga I players
Ligue 1 players
Süper Lig players
SC Bastia players
Espérance Sportive de Tunis players
Leyton Orient F.C. players
FC Astra Giurgiu players
Stade Malherbe Caen players
Kasımpaşa S.K. footballers
Denizlispor footballers
CFR Cluj players
PFC Beroe Stara Zagora players
US Quevilly-Rouen Métropole players
2015 Africa Cup of Nations players
2017 Africa Cup of Nations players
2018 FIFA World Cup players
Tunisian expatriate footballers
Tunisian expatriate sportspeople in England
Expatriate footballers in England
Tunisian expatriate sportspeople in Romania
Expatriate footballers in Romania
Tunisian expatriate sportspeople in Turkey
Expatriate footballers in Turkey
Tunisian expatriate sportspeople in France
Expatriate footballers in France